October Sky is a Canadian rock band from Montreal, Canada. Formed in 2000, the group currently consists of lead vocalist and guitarist Karl Raymond and drummer Alex Racine. The style of their early music, including their debut album Hell Isn't My Home, has been described as progressive, but they started to add several electronic elements to their sound on subsequent albums. The Aphotic Season was the first step in that new direction but their latest EP Rise  marked a major shift in their sound.

To date, October Sky have released two full-length albums - Hell Isn't My Home (2008) and The Aphotic Season (2012), and three EPs - October Sky EP (2006), Green and Beautiful EP (2010), Rise (2015).

History

Early years (2000-2005)
October Sky originated from the suburbs of Montreal in 2000, when high school friends Karl Raymond and Alex Racine started playing hard rock music together. When keyboardist Yanik Rouleau joined in 2004, the style of music they played evolved to a more progressive and alternative feel. Shortly after Yanik joined the band, they entered in and won a local battle of the bands contest called Exposure, among 85 bands. The positive feedback they received therein prompted them to go on a small tour in regional areas of Quebec in 2005, including shows in and around Montreal. During this time, they took home yet another battle of the bands contest called Concours Studio Sixieme Sens. The prize for the latter involved a substantial amount of recording time, where they recorded their first eponymous EP. It was at Studio Sixieme Sens that the band learned the ropes in recording procedures and techniques, where they were given the opportunity to experiment and start to truly define their sound.

First EP (2006-2007)
October Sky self-released their first EP in 2006, highlighted by the band's first self-produced concert to a crowd of 450 fans and friends.

October Sky's next big move was to set up camp in Toronto, Ontario, where they would live for 8 months, to explore the strong Toronto independent music scene. They discovered the opportunity to enter another contest, Toronto Indie Week, in which they were titled "Top Finalist" (among 370 North American bands). After having played 18 concerts in the Toronto Metropolitan Area, and having soaked up all they could about the music industry in Canada's largest city, they would move back to Montreal to recruit bassist Andrew Walker in early 2007.

The summer of 2007 saw the band spending a lot of their time writing and recording in their newly built home studio. Late fall, they were on the verge of completion of a 10 track album. On October 10, 2007, October Sky independently launched their debut album Hell Isn't My Home at the Cafe Campus in Montreal to a crowd of 500 fans.

Shortly after, the band entered a battle of the bands contest called Omnium Du Rock. While finishing second in the final, they were approached by one of the judges, an agent for the record distribution company TRX Distribution, based in Montreal.

Hell Isn't My Home (2008-2009)
October Sky signed a distribution deal with TRX Distribution in the summer of 2008, and officially released Hell Isn't My Home on September 2, 2008, online and in all Archambault music stores in Quebec and Ontario. The band put on album launch parties for the media on September 2 at Cafe Campus in Montreal and September 3 at The Rivoli in Toronto.

In promotion of the album, the band set out on a cross-Canadian tour of 21 shows in 16 different cities from Sherbrooke, Quebec to Vancouver, BC from September 18th to October 31st, 2008, having opened for Mobile a couple of times.

The album was well received by the media, receiving radio play on over 20 commercial radio stations across Canada. Their music video for "Hit the Ground" debuted at number 4, ahead of Madonna and Justin Timberlake, on MusiquePlus' "Plus sur commande," a television show playing the most requested music videos of the week. The music video was also playlisted on MuchLOUD. October Sky won three Toronto Exclusive Magazine Awards for their debut album Hell Isn't My Home.

In the harsh Canadian winter of early 2009, October Sky was invited to play on two occasions in the Feerie des Glaces festival in Mont-Tremblant, Quebec, whereby they opened for classic rock veteran Michel Pagliaro.

Later that year, TRX Distribution was bought out by distribution company DEP under Universal Music Canada, and October Sky and Universal failed to reach an agreement to continue distributing Hell Isn't My Home.

October Sky then entered what they decided would be their last contest, called Global Battle of the Bands (GBOB), an international competition, as the name suggests. They won the Montreal regional finals in May, and moved on to play in the Canadian National Finals at the Envol and Macadam Festival in Quebec City, where they had the privilege of opening for Alexisonfire and Bad Religion. Their victory would bring them to London for the World Finals in 2010.

Green and Beautiful EP and Europe (2010-2011)
In January 2010, October Sky traveled to Toronto to record a three-song demo with producer Brian Moncarz at Rattlebox Studios, which is co-owned by Brian and Grammy-winning producer David Bottrill. The demo ended up being the basis for Green and Beautiful EP, released on September 21 of 2010. The EP also features several live tracks and a remix of "Hell Isn't My Home" by DJ Nota.

The band took a trip to perform at The Scala in London, UK, in the World Finals of the GBOB, competing against 18 other countries on April 27, 2010.

That summer, October Sky were given the opportunity to perform at the Osheaga Festival in an acoustic tent in association with War Child. Henceforth, in promotion of Green and Beautiful EP, October Sky ventured off to France and Belgium for an 11-day tour in November and December 2010.

The band performed acoustically on Quebec's popular television show L'echelle du talent: Zero a 1000, which aired on V Tele in November, 2011, during its first season. They were invited back on the show at the beginning of the following season as part of the "best of" series of the first season.

In March 2011, October Sky performed during Canadian Music Week in Toronto, and followed up with a headlining performance at Club Soda, a well-known venue in Montreal, where they recorded Live in Montreal EP. Less than a month later, the band went back to London, UK, to perform a showcase to the UK music industry and local fans, called Discovery 2 Showcase. Subsequently, the band returned to Toronto to perform another showcase as part of North by Northeast in June, followed by back-to-back performances at the Festival d'ete de Beloeil, a popular music festival in Beloeil, Quebec, including an opening slot for comedian Rachid Badouri.

The band crossed the Atlantic Ocean once again to embark on a 2-month tour of the UK from mid-September to mid-November to develop their fan base there, featuring over 20 performances in over 10 different cities. They officially released their debut album Hell Isn't My Home to the UK public on October 3, 2011, along with their single "Hit the Ground", receiving radio play on NME Radio, TotalRock Radio, East Kent Radio, Emma Scott Presents and others.

The Aphotic Season (2012)
Shortly after the return of their UK tour at the end of 2011, October Sky recorded 7 songs with producer Luc Tellier. On April 2, 2012. October Sky
announced the release of the forthcoming album called The Aphotic Season which has been available June 18, 2012 worldwide. Later that year, the band released the second single of that album called Green And Beautiful on October 30th, 2012.  The same song used for the title of their last EP was remixed by producer Luc Tellier, then put back on their latest record to become a single. A video produced and animated by Paul Kuchar from Kool Factor company received great reviews shortly after its release. Within 2 weeks, the video had reached 8 800 views on YouTube. The video is made up of traditional hand drawn animation, set in a 3D space, adding a certain degree of depth.

Rise (2015)
October Sky spent 2014 in studio writing and recording songs with producer ‘’Paul Milner’’. They wrote more than 15 new songs and chose the best seven to put on an EP called ‘’Rise’’. That 7 track album was released in October 2015 followed by a tour of 32 shows across the United States during spring 2016. From the EP Rise, the band released 2 singles: The Moment and Break me if you can for which they produced an official video that was premiered in worldwide exclusivity by Yahoo!. On November 29th 2016, October Sky released a Live off the floor session called Rise Sessions with long time friend Gabriel Lobato. The band shot multi angle videos of live performances for the songs Break me if you can, Live again and All this sound.

Discography

Albums
Hell Isn't My Home (2008)
The Aphotic Season (2012)

EPs
October Sky EP (2006)
Green and Beautiful EP (2010)
Rise (2015)

References

External links
 

Musical groups established in 2000
Musical groups from Montreal
Canadian alternative rock groups